The Warsaw Icon Museum is the first museum in Warsaw and the third in Poland dedicated to icons. Located in the Ochota district of Warsaw, Poland, the museum is housed in a former boilerhouse.

See also
Polish Orthodox Church
Jerzy Nowosielski
Byzantine art
Religious image

References

External links 
 Prayer service opens Museum of Icons in Poland

Religious museums in Poland
Religious art
Art museums established in 2011
2011 establishments in Poland
Museums in Warsaw
Ochota
Museums established in 2011
21st-century religious buildings and structures in Poland